The 1970 United States Senate election in Maine was held on November 3, 1970. Incumbent Democrat Edmund Muskie defeated Republican nominee Neil S. Bishop with 61.74% of the vote.

Primary elections
Primary elections were held on June 15, 1970.

Republican primary

Candidates
Neil S. Bishop, former State Senator
Abbott O. Greene

Results

General election

Candidates
Edmund Muskie, Democratic
Neil S. Bishop, Republican

Results

References

1970
Maine
United States Senate